is a prefecture of Japan located on the island of Kyūshū. Miyazaki Prefecture has a population of 1,073,054 (1 June 2019) and has a geographic area of 7,735 km2 (2,986 sq mi). Miyazaki Prefecture borders Ōita Prefecture to the north, Kumamoto Prefecture to the northwest, and Kagoshima Prefecture to the southwest.

Miyazaki is the capital and largest city of Miyazaki Prefecture, with other major cities including Miyakonojō, Nobeoka, and Hyūga. Miyazaki Prefecture is located in southeastern Kyūshū on Japan's Pacific coast, with its coastline extending from Nobeoka near the entrance to the Bungo Channel to Shibushi Bay in Kushima.

History 

Historically, after the Meiji Restoration, Hyūga Province was renamed Miyazaki Prefecture.

In Japan, Miyazaki Prefecture was first created in 1873 when Mimitsu Prefecture was merged with parts of Miyakonojō Prefecture. The first Miyazaki existed only until 1876 when it was merged (back) into Kagoshima Prefecture. Under public pressure and demands in the prefectural assembly of Kagoshima, Miyazaki became finally independent from Kagoshima in 1883.

Geography 
Miyazaki Prefecture is on the eastern coast of the island of Kyushu, surrounded by the Pacific Ocean to the south and east, Ōita Prefecture to the north, and Kumamoto and Kagoshima prefectures to the west. It is one of only two locations on Earth where the fungus Chorioactis geaster is found.  Miyazaki is the home of the hyuganatsu fruit. It is also home to two virgin forests of the palm Livistona chinensis, one of which, on the islet of Aoshima, Miyazaki, is the northernmost reproducing population of its native range.

As of 31 March 2019, 12% of the total land area of the prefecture was designated as Natural Parks, namely the Kirishima-Kinkōwan National Park; Kyūshū Chūō Sanchi, Nichinan Kaigan, Nippō Kaigan, and Sobo-Katamuki Quasi-National Parks; and Mochio-Sekinoo, Osuzu, Saitobaru-Sugiyasukyō, Sobo Katamuki, Wanitsuka, and Yatake Kōgen Prefectural Natural Parks.

Cities

Nine cities are in Miyazaki Prefecture:

Districts

These are the towns and villages of each district:

Mergers

Sports 
The sports teams/events listed below are based in Miyazaki.

Football (soccer)
Honda Lock S.C. (Miyazaki City)
Tegevajaro Miyazaki (Miyazaki City)

Basketball (Bj League)
Miyazaki Shining Suns (Miyazaki City)

Golf (Japan Golf Tour)
Dunlop Phoenix Tournament (ダンロップフェニックストーナメント, Danroppu fenikkusu tōnamento) (Miyazaki City)
 Annual Japan Golf Tour event, with one of the highest prize money amounts on the tour, that attracts top players from around the world.

Press Media

Newspaper
 Miyazaki Daily Newspaper
 Evening Daily (Different from the Daily Sports evening edition published in Kanto)
 The Yomiuri Shimbun, Asahi Shimbun, Mainichi Shimbun, Nishi Nihon Shimbun and Minami Nihon Shimbun also have branch offices and communication departments in the prefecture.
The Miyazaki Nichi-Nichi Shimbun is a local newspaper covering the entire area of Miyazaki Prefecture.

The Yomiuri / Asahi / Daily newspapers handle the Miyazaki edition, and the Nishi-Nippon Shimbun handles articles in the prefecture within Minami Kyushu Wide (two prefectures in Miyazaki and Kagoshima). The Minami Nihon Shimbun is a local newspaper in Kagoshima Prefecture, but it is also sold in the western part of the prefecture (prefectures). The Nishi Nihon Shimbun ended its publication in both Miyazaki and Kagoshima prefectures on March 31, 2018 (the same applies to West Japan Sports).

Telecast

TV station Status
In this prefecture, even after many broadcasting stations (Heisei New Station) opened in other prefectures and the number of channels increased, private broadcasting as the target area of broadcasting is the Fuji TV series main TV Miyazaki (UMK) and TBS series There are only two stations of Miyazaki Broadcasting (MRT). In the 1990s, a third commercial TV station was scheduled to be created, but it has been abandoned, and there are no plans or plans for the opening of a new station (see details in the separate section).

There are other prefectures (Fukui Prefecture and Yamanashi Prefecture) where there are only two commercial broadcasters, but these prefectures are areas where broadcast stations in the neighboring prefectures can watch by means of public hearing facilities, cable TV (CATV) or direct reception outside the area. Is the majority. On the other hand, in this prefecture, as will be described later, the penetration rate of cable TV is low for the number of private broadcasters, and the reception outside the area is also limited to Kagoshima Prefecture in parts of Ebino City, Miyakonojo City, Kushima City, Mimata Town There is a relative disparity in information in Japan because the broadcast area is limited to the broadcast area where Kumamoto Prefecture is the broadcast area in some areas such as Gokase-cho. It is said that.

Until the opening of NHK Miyazaki Broadcasting Station in July 1960, the Kagoshima Station was received in Miyazaki City, and before the Kagoshima Station was opened, the Hiroshima Station was received using ionospheric reflection, as well as Gokase Town and Shiiba Village. Then Kumamoto station was watched. See Gokase Relay Station for the situation in Gokase Town.

On the other hand, as described above, there are only two channels that can be directly viewed in Miyazaki Prefecture as described above (this is not the case if you can watch stations in neighboring prefectures). There are also locations that receive broadcasts from neighboring prefectures (mainly Kagoshima and Kumamoto Prefectures) that perform full networks of the ANN (TV Asahi) series and NNS / NNN (Nippon TV) series, which are sub-affiliated sub-series. (Refer to the separate section for details.)

Proposed TV Station
In 1990, the third private broadcasting station was assigned (Miyazaki 21ch), and about 400 licenses were filed. Among them, NTV had a plan to set up a broadcasting station with Okinawa (see Southwest Broadcasting for Okinawa), but it was necessary to inject funds into satellite broadcasting due to the effects of the recession after the collapse of the bubble economy and satellite broadcasting.

By April 1993, “The program will be provided free of charge, but it will not support the opening of the station and will not be given any compensation for the network” (meaning that you have to search for sponsors yourself), and will advance to Miyazaki as a key station. Abandoned. For this reason, there was a plan to use TV Asahi as a key station later, but the TV Asahi side showed disappointment, thus the idea of setting up the third station was on the reef and on September 6, 2000. The radio wave assignment has been canceled. The land reserved for the new Miyazaki station later became a parking lot.

Former Governor Hideo Higashikokubaru also posted an extension of the TV station in the manifesto, but this was not necessarily a terrestrial commercial release, but also an image of Internet TV. On the other hand, the Institute for Manifest Research at Waseda University has judged this manifest as a C evaluation (minimum of the three stages of A, B, and C), which is “substantially delayed or policy change＂.

Miyazaki Method
The Miyazaki system for TV transmitters means that the local government that is the beneficiary bears a part of the installation cost of the relay station.

As a private broadcasting station, the coverage rate in the prefecture is almost 100% just by setting up a plan station, so the installation of a relay station in a mountainous area was not expected to be cost-effective. This was the direction of installation due to the fact that the local government in the Irago district (current Misato-cho, Togo-cho, Hyuga-shi, Morozuka-mura, Shiiba-mura) applied to the broadcasting station for a part of the installation cost in 1973. . As a result, relay stations were set up in Irago, Hinata Saigo, Togo (1973), Kita Morozuka, Minami Morozuka, Shiiba (1974). Since then, this method has basically been adopted for relay stations installed in Miyazaki Prefecture.

Radio
 NHK Miyazaki Broadcasting Station (AM / FM)
 Miyazaki Broadcasting (MRT Radio) (JRN / NRN series)
 FM Miyazaki (JOY FM) (JFN affiliate, TV Miyazaki affiliate)
 Miyazaki Sunshine FM (community broadcast)-Miyazaki City resends music bird in some time zone
 City FM Miyakonojo (Community Broadcast)-Miyakonojo City, resend J-WAVE at certain times
 FM beoka (community broadcast)-Nobeoka
 FM Hyuga (Community Broadcasting)-Hyuga City / Kadokawa Town, operated by Cable Media Waiwai, re-sends music birds at some times
In Miyazaki City, there was a community FM station, Miyazaki City FM (City FM77), which was closed on October 31, 2005.

Transportation

Rail
 JR Kyushu
Nippō Main Line, Miyazaki Kūkō Line, Nichinan Line, Kitto Line, Hisatsu Line

Bus
 Miyazaki Kōtsu

Airport
 Miyazaki Airport

See also
 History of Miyazaki Prefecture
 Miyazaki Ocean Dome

Notes

References
 Nussbaum, Louis-Frédéric and Käthe Roth. (2005).  Japan encyclopedia. Cambridge: Harvard University Press. ;  OCLC 58053128

External links

Official Miyazaki Prefecture website
Official Miyazaki Prefecture website 
Miyazaki and Vicinity Information from the JNTO

Video Footage
The following travel- and tourism-related videos were shot and provided by video artist egawauemon.
General video footage
Scenery-related video footage
Culture-related video footage
Leisure-related video footage
Food-related video footage
Golf-related video footage

 
Kyushu region
Prefectures of Japan